The Otago shag, (Leucocarbo chalconotus), together with the Foveaux shag formerly known as the Stewart Island shag and in its dark phase as the bronze shag, is a species of shag now found only in coastal Otago, New Zealand.

Description 
The species is dimorphic, with two plumages. Roughly one quarter of the individuals are pied, with dark and white feathers, and the rest, known as bronze shags, are dark all over. Both morphs breed together. These large, chunky birds are about 70 cm long, weigh about 2–3 kg, and are slightly larger than Foveaux shags.

They can be distinguished from Foveaux shags by their facial ornamentation in the breeding season: Foveaux shags have dark orange papillae on their face, whereas Otago shags have both papillae and small bright orange facial caruncles above the base of the bill.

Classification 
Until 2016, Otago shags and the closely related shags living around Stewart Island and Foveaux Strait were considered to be a single species, called the Stewart Island shag. Mitochondrial DNA suggests Otago shags are actually more closely related to Chatham shags (Leucocarbo onslowi), and osteological and genetic differences supported separating off Foveaux shags as a distinct species, L. stewarti. Foveaux and Otago shags probably diverged when populations were split up by lower sea levels in the Pleistocene, and the Chatham Islands were subsequently colonised by shags from Otago. Other taxonomists have kept the Otago shag and the Foveaux shag conspecific.

A recent taxonomic revision argues that Leucocarbo is a distinct genus, which would contain amongst other species the Otago, Foveaux, and Chatham shags. Others place it in the genus Phalacrocorax.

Distribution and conservation 
Archaeological evidence shows that Otago shags were formerly found along the entire east coast of the South Island up to Marlborough, but when humans arrived the population was devastated, reduced by 99 percent within 100 years with a corresponding loss of genetic diversity. It became restricted to the rocky offshore islets off the Otago Peninsula, and has scarcely recovered since that time. There are less than 2500 Otago shags remaining, but they can be seen at Otago Harbour, as far north as Oamaru, and as far south as the Catlins. Restricted to a small area, and having little or no genetic variation, they require conservation efforts tailored to these extinction risk factors; this could include reintroduction to part of their former range.

Otago shags breed colonially from May to September, making raised cup nests out of organic material and guano on islands and sea cliffs. Colonies are large enough to be strikingly visible, and are used year after year. One notable colony is on the northern shore of Taiaroa Head, at the mouth of the Otago Harbour. They feed in coastal waters less than 30 m deep and are rarely if ever seen inland or far out to sea.

References

External links 
 Otago shag discussed on RadioNZ Critter of the Week, 4 March 2016

Otago shag
Birds of the South Island
Otago shag
Otago shag
Endemic birds of New Zealand